Gaza Sky Geeks (GSG), previously known as the Arab Developer Network Initiative, is the first and only tech hub and startup accelerator in Gaza in Palestine. It was founded in 2011 with the backing of the global humanitarian organization Mercy Corps and Google, after Google executives, led by then Google.org and Google[X] head Megan Smith, visited Gaza. GSG has since then been supported by other Silicon Valley companies, such as Microsoft, and by international donors such as the Konrad Adenauer Foundation. 

The stated purpose of GSG is to create a stage for young talents to grow while improving their skills through receiving professional mentoring and performing hands-on work. It encourages female startup members within the IT community to engage in business and software engineering activities. It provides start-up grants for young IT entrepreneurs to begin their businesses. GSG hosts up to 140 people a day, with almost half of those being women. A second location opened in Hebron in 2018. Representatives from large tech companies like Uber, Google, SoundCloud, Microsoft, 500 Startups, Endeavor Global, Udacity, Hitachi, and more have visited the tech hub.

History 
In 2008 and 2009 employees of Google tried to enter Gaza as part of their developer outreach program but were unable to do so because of the blockade of the Gaza Strip. In 2011 they gained access thanks to Mercy Corps which carried out humanitarian work in Gaza. Google contributed a one-time seed grant of $900,000 which Mercy Corps used to launch the Arab Developer Network Initiative to stimulate tech and entrepreneurship in the isolated enclave. In 2013 the tech hub developed into an accelerator. In 2014, GSG ran a crowdfunding campaign bringing in $279,000. In 2017, GSG launched two new programs: the Gaza Code Academy and the Freelancing Academy. 

A major obstacle for Palestinian freelancers is handling online payments as PayPal is unavailable to Palestinians. In March 2018, MasterCard began researching e-payment solutions for Palestinians.

Programs  
Gaza Sky Geeks runs three main programs: Code Academy, GeeXeleator and Skylancer Academy. These were interrupted by the COVID-19 pandemic in the State of Palestine.

Code Academy 

The Code Academy is a six-month long web development bootcamp with 16 students in each cohort (half female), hosted on campuses in Gaza City and Hebron, launched in partnership with a UK-based bootcamp, Founders & Coders International in 2017. The curriculum covers test-driven development, JavaScript, relational databases, UX design, and project management.

GeeXelerator 
GeeXelerator is GSG's 16-week pre-seed startup accelerator program. It helps teams build minimum viable products and to validate them with users. In 2018, 34 teams participated in the program. Access to co-working space, fiber internet, and other amenities in the GSG's facilities are provided along with $2,000 in grant money per team that is accepted into the program. Participants are expected to already have a strong business case and are selected through interviews.

GSG runs a related, six-weeks long program, called Idea Labs.

SkyLancer Academy 
The Skylancer Academy (previously known as the Freelance Academy) is GSG's program for teaching freelancing. It offers two full-time tracks providing mentoring to beginning freelancers. The first track is a ten-week program teaching young people already familiar web development, graphical design, mobile development and social media how to succeed as freelancers.

Impact 
According to Damian Radcliffe, GSG has helped create over 100 jobs and $91,000 in revenue. GSG has, according to Yolande Knell, helped nearly 30 startups acquire seed money and investment and its freelancing graduates have earned more than $400,000.

Notes and references

Citations

Bibliography

Articles

Books

External links  
 He Found A Way Out Of Gaza. Then, Something Drew Him Back, 2018, Elizabeth MacBride, Forbes.
 رواد الأعمال - غزة إسكاي جيكس.. مجتمع ريادة الأعمال بغزة (Arabic video), 2019, Al Jazeera, YouTube.
 Mentoring the Geeks of Gaza, 2020, Tara Meyer, Factory Berlin.
 Fear and Coding in Gaza (video), 2020, Tom Hayton, TEDx, YouTube.

Entrepreneurship organizations

Organizations based in the State of Palestine

Science and technology in the State of Palestine

Business incubators
Gaza City
Organizations established in 2011
 S